Major General Sir Frederick Carrington,  (23 August 1844, Cheltenham – 22 March 1913, Cheltenham), was a British soldier and friend of Cecil Rhodes. He acquired fame by suppressing the 1896 Matabele rebellion.

Biography

Carrington was educated at Cheltenham College and joined the 24th Regiment of Foot in 1864.

In 1875, he arrived in South Africa where he raised and commanded the Mounted Infantry in the Griqualand West expedition and the Frontier Light Horse in the Ninth Frontier War in 1877.

He commanded the Transvaal Volunteer Force against Sekhukhune in 1878–1879 and the Cape Mounted Riflemen in the Basuto Gun War of 1881.  He was severely wounded in this campaign.

In 1885, he accompanied Sir Charles Warren's expedition to Bechuanaland in command of the 2nd Mounted Infantry, which soon became known as 'Carrington's Horse'.

He commanded the Bechuanaland Police beginning in 1888.  He also was appointed military adviser to the High Commissioner in the First Matabele War and commanded the British force in the Matabele Rebellion in 1896.

Carrington was in command of Belfast district in 1899–1900. Following the outbreak of the Second Boer War in October 1899, he was appointed on the staff of the South Africa Field Force on 28 February 1900, with the local rank of a lieutenant-general to be in command of the Rhodesian Field Force. This was a field force established to prevent attacks on Rhodesia from the south, and the soldiers were drawn from the various colonial contingents in the war, including the South Australian Citizen Bushmen (though not from Rhodesia itself). Carrington left for South Africa in March 1900 on the SS Dunottar Castle, and arrived in Cape Town the following month.

He was created a Knight Commander of the Order of St Michael and St George (KCMG) in 1887, a Knight Commander of the Order of the Bath (KCB) in 1897, and retired with the rank of major-general.

He was the father-in-law of World War I fighter ace William Mayes Fry and the father of the writer Dorothy Carrington.

References

Bibliography

External links

 Article and colour painting at Pine Tree Web

British Army major generals
Cape Colony army officers
Commissioners of the Bechuanaland Protectorate
1844 births
1913 deaths
British Army personnel of the Anglo-Zulu War
British military personnel of the Bechuanaland Expedition
British Army personnel of the Second Boer War
People of the Basuto Gun War
People of the Second Matabele War
People of the Sekukuni Campaign
People educated at Cheltenham College
Knights Commander of the Order of the Bath
Knights Commander of the Order of St Michael and St George
1880s in Bechuanaland Protectorate